Reading 2101 is a preserved American class "T-1" 4-8-4 "Northern" type steam locomotive constructed in 1945 for use by the Reading Company.  Constructed from an earlier "I10SA" 2-8-0 "Consolidation"-type locomotive built in 1923, the 2101 handled heavy coal train traffic for the Reading until being retired from revenue service in 1959. Withheld from scrapping, the 2101 served as emergency backup power for the three other T1 locomotives serving the Reading's "Iron Horse Rambler" excursions until being sold for scrap in 1964. In 1975, the locomotive was restored to operation from scrapyard condition in an emergency 30-day overhaul after being selected to pull the first eastern portion of the American Freedom Train. On March 6, 1979, while being stored one winter in a Chessie System roundhouse in Silver Grove, KY, 2101 was severely damaged in a fire. Also damaged in that fire was a NYC Mohawk tender, which is now located at the National New York Central Railroad Museum in Elkhart, Indiana. 2101 was cosmetically restored and placed in the B&O Railroad Museum on Labor Day, 1979, in exchange for Chesapeake and Ohio 614. Today the locomotive remains on display in its American Freedom Train #1 paint scheme.

History

Revenue service
Reading No. 2101 is a class "T-1" 4-8-4 "Northern" type steam locomotive that was one of 30 4-8-4s that were converted from 30 class "I-10sa" 2-8-0 "Consolidation" type locomotives from 1945 through 1947 by the Reading Railroad when management wanted faster and more powerful locomotives, but had no spare cash to order completely new ones. Starting in 1945 the Reading took 30 of its 2-8-0s and converted them with a little help from Baldwin Locomotive Works into 30 new 4-8-4 locomotives that were numbered 2100-2129 and classified as class "T1". No. 2101 was originally built by Baldwin in 1923 as I-10a 2-8-0 No. 2037 and was converted to Reading No. 2101 in 1945.

For its entire service life, No. 2101 pulled many freight and passenger trains from 1945 to 1956 when nearly all steam on the Reading was sent to scrap, except for five T1s: 2100, 2101, 2102, 2123 and 2124. No. 2101 was cared for in the Reading's Roundhouse from 1959 to 1964 as a standby locomotive for the famous "Iron Horse Rambles". October 17, 1964, saw the 50th and last Ramble excursion when rising operational costs and deteriorating track forced the end of these special fan trips. Afterwards, No. 2101 was sold along with No. 2100 in September 1967 to Streigel Equipment and Supply of Baltimore, Maryland, where it would be stored for the next eight years.

Excursion service
In 1975, the country was gearing up for America's Bicentennial and plans were underway for The American Freedom Train which would travel across the country stopping in dozens of cities and pulled by steam locomotives. Led by Ross Rowland, a nationwide search was carried out to search for locomotives in restorable condition to pull the train. Southern Pacific 4449 and Reading No. 2101 were selected for the trip (A group of dedicated preservationists in Ft. Worth also rebuilt a steam locomotive that would pull the train in Texas, Texas and Pacific 610). No. 2101 was pulled from the scrapyard and restored to operating condition on March 28, 1975 in only 30 days in the same building where it was constructed from a 2-8-0 nearly 30 years earlier—and painted as "American Freedom Train #1". 

No. 2101 pulled the eastern section of the trip before giving it to the SP 4449 in Chicago for the western section. On the return trip east, No. 2101 again took charge of the train at Birmingham, AL and pulled the train through much of New England, handing the train back to the SP 4449 at the Pentagon.

Less than two years later, No. 2101 was repainted into a bright yellow and orange livery and pulled many excursions arranged by Ross Rowland on the Chessie System as the "Chessie Steam Special" to celebrate the 150th birthday of the Baltimore and Ohio Railroad before becoming victim to a 1979 roundhouse fire in Russell, Kentucky. While most damage was cosmetic, it was damaged to such an extent that it would need a complete overhaul to be in service after the fire.

Disposition
After the fire incident, it was then decided that No. 2101 would be retired once again and would be traded to the B&O Railroad Museum for Chesapeake & Ohio 614 where it would haul the 1981 Chessie Safety Express from Baltimore to Hagerstown and return. Since then it has been cosmetically restored as "American Freedom Train #1" and is on static display. Upon restoration after the fire, its tender was swapped for the tender belonging to No. 2100. When locomotive No. 2100 was restored, the No. 2101 tender was also restored and converted to oil. The 2100 loco and No. 2101 tender were stored together in Richland, Washington until April 2015 when they were shipped to Cleveland, Ohio for restoration to operating condition, and will be converted back to burn coal once again. As of 2022, No. 2101 still remains on static display at the museum.

Accidents and incidents
 In July 1948, the 2101 suffered a catastrophic derailment, supposedly while pulling a freight train. The specific location is unknown, and it is unknown if the engineer, fireman, or leading brakeman were injured or killed.
 In March 1979, a roundhouse at Stevens Yard in Silver Grove, Kentucky caught fire with the 2101 inside, causing the locomotive to be damaged. The status of mechanical soundness was unknown due to the fire and it was traded to the B&O Railroad Museum in exchange for Chesapeake and Ohio 614, and it was cosmetically restored back to its American Freedom Train livery.

References

External links
 
Reading 2101 and the 1975-1976 Bicentennial American Freedom Train
Surviving T1s
Reading 2101 and the 1977-1978 Chessie Steam Special

Individual locomotives of the United States
4-8-4 locomotives
Baldwin locomotives
Philadelphia and Reading Railroad locomotives
Freight locomotives
2101
Standard gauge locomotives of the United States
Preserved steam locomotives of Maryland
Railway locomotives introduced in 1925